Ingle is an unincorporated community in Nassau County, Florida, United States. It is located on US 301, in the southwestern part of the county which is in the northeastern part of the state.

Geography
Ingle is located at  (30.4189, -81.9278).

References

Unincorporated communities in Nassau County, Florida
Unincorporated communities in the Jacksonville metropolitan area
Unincorporated communities in Florida